The Speedy Trial Clause of the Sixth Amendment to the United States Constitution provides, "In all criminal prosecutions, the accused shall enjoy the right to a speedy and public trial...". The Clause protects the defendant from delay between the presentation of the indictment or similar charging instrument and the beginning of trial.

History 
In Barker v. Wingo (1972), the Supreme Court developed a four-part test that considers the length of the delay, the reasons for the delay, the defendant's assertion of his right to a speedy trial, and the prejudice to the defendant. A violation of the Speedy Trial Clause is cause for dismissal with prejudice of a criminal case. Within these parameters, it was determined that the five-year wait for this case to go trial was not in violation of the Constitution. In response, in 1974, Congress passed the Speedy Trial Act.

This Speedy trial clause protects defendants from waiting more than a certain amount of time for a trial.

Speedy trial statutes
In addition to the constitutional guarantee, various state and federal statutes confer a more specific right to a speedy trial. In New York, the prosecution must be "ready for trial" within six months on all felonies except murder, or the charges are dismissed by action of law without regard to the merits of the case. This is also known as a "ready rule". In California courts, defendants have a right to a trial within 100 days to a year.

The federal law detailing this right is the Speedy Trial Act of 1974.  All U.S. states have either statutes or constitutional provisions detailing this right. In 1979 the Act was amended to ensure that the defendant had time to provide a suitable defense. This amendment made it so trial could not start within less than 30 days after the defendant first appeared in the court.

Speedy trial cases 
In Doggett v. United States (1992) the Supreme Court determined that Doggett's eight and a half year wait for a trial violated his sixth amendment rights.

In Zedner v. United States (2006) the Supreme Court determined that a defendant cannot waive his right to a speedy trial using the Speedy Trial Clause because the clause protects all parties involved in a case to ensure that no one's interests are being implicated.

See also
 Speedy trial
 Justice delayed is justice denied

References

Further reading

United States constitutional criminal procedure

Clauses of the United States Constitution
Clause